Meidell may refer to:

Frank Meidell Falch (1920–2013), Norwegian media director
Gerhard Meidell Gerhardsen (1848–1912) (1848–1912), Norwegian bailiff and politician for the Conservative Party
Gerhard Meidell Gerhardsen (1885–1931) (1885–1931), Norwegian bailiff and politician for the Conservative Party and Centre Party
Gerhard Meidell Gerhardsen (1912-1986) (1912–1986), Norwegian economist
Egil Meidell Hopp (1898–1972), Norwegian journalist and intelligence agent
Einar Meidell Hopp (1899–1956), Norwegian broadcasting personality
Christian Meidell Kahrs (1858–1924), Norwegian businessperson and politician for the Liberal Party and later the Coalition Party
Arne Meidell (1894–1963), Norwegian jurist and businessperson
Birger Meidell (1882–1958), professor, member of The Norwegian Science Academy, minister in the fascist NS government of Vidkun Quisling
Christian Garup Meidell (1780–1863), Norwegian military officer and politician
Ditmar Meidell (1826–1900), Norwegian magazine and newspaper editor
Kristian Garup Meidell (1866–1926), Norwegian barrister
Sigurd Segelcke Meidell (1878–1968), Norwegian journalist, genealogist and novelist

See also
Medel (disambiguation)